The 1896 Boston College football team was an American football team that represented Boston College as an independent during the 1896 college football season. Led by Frank Carney in his first and only season as head coach, Boston College compiled a record of 5–3.

This was the first year of the Boston College–Holy Cross football rivalry, and produced one of its most controversial games. BC and HC both claim to have won their November 14 matchup at the South End Grounds, after each one refused to follow referees' instructions following a disputed play with three minutes remaining in the game. Holy Cross was leading 6–4 when Boston College scored what its players, and a raucous home crowd, asserted was the go-ahead touchdown; Holy Cross maintained the runner had been tackled for a loss. Officials initially ruled in favor of Holy Cross, and Boston College's players refused to take the field, leading the officials to declare a 6–4 Holy Cross win. Under pressure from the Boston crowd, however, they reversed their decision and asked Holy Cross, which had now left the field itself, to resume play. Holy Cross players refused. The game restarted with only Boston College players, who promptly scored a touchdown (then worth 4 points) to end the game with an 8–6 victory. Decades later, the two colleges continued to disagree on who had won the game.

Schedule

References

Boston College
Boston College Eagles football seasons
Boston College football
19th century in Boston